The County of Auxerre is a former state of current central France, with capital in Auxerre.

History
The first count attested by the sources is one Ermenaud, a companion of Charlemagne who reigned around 770. In 859 Charles the Bald handed over the county to his cousin Conrad II of Burgundy. When he revolted, the county was assigned to Robert the Strong. After the latter's death, Hugh the Abbot was count, but named a viscount in his lieu; later Auxerre was absorbed in Richard of Burgundy's dominion.

Count John IV sold it to the King of France in 1370. After the Treaty of Arras (1435) between Charles VII of France and Philip III of Burgundy, it returned once again to the latter. In 1477, with the annexion of Burgundy, it became definitively part of France.

See also
Nevers
Duchy of Burgundy

List of counts
Peonius, under Chlothar I
Ermenaud I of Auxerre, ca. 758
Ermenaud II of Auxerre ca. 800
Ermenaud III of Auxerre, ca. 840
Jouvert of Auxerre, ca. 853
Conrad I of Auxerre, duke of Transjuran Burgundy, 859–864
Robert the Strong, 864–866 following his marriage with Conrad's widow Adelaide of Tours
Conrad II of Auxerre, son of Conrad and Adelaide, 853–876
Hugh the Abbot, younger brother of Conrad II, 876–886
Richard the Justiciar, 886–921, married Conrad II's daughter Adelaide
Rudolph of France (also Raoul or Ralph), 921-923 until his election as King of France
Hugh the Black, 923-952
Gilbert of Chalon, 952-956
Otto of Paris, 956-965
Otto-Henry 965–1002
Landerich of Monceau, 1002-1028
Renauld, son of Landerich, 1028–1040
Robert I, Duke of Burgundy, briefly in 1040
William I, Count of Nevers, son of Renauld, 1040–1083
Renauld II of Nevers (son) 1083–1089  (count of Auxerre and Nevers)
William II, Count of Nevers (son) 1097–1148  (count of Auxerre, Tonnerre and Nevers)
William III, Count of Nevers (son) 1148–1161 (count of Auxerre, Tonnerre and Nevers)
William IV, Count of Nevers (son) 1161–1168 (count of Auxerre, Tonnerre and Nevers)
Guy I of Nevers (brother) 1168–1175 (count of Tonnerre, Auxerre and Nevers)
William V, Count of Nevers (son) 1175–1181 (count of Auxerre, Tonnerre and Nevers)
Agnes I of Nevers (sister) 1181–1192
Peter II of Courtenay 1184–1218 (married to Agnes)
Mahault I of Coutenay (daughter) 1218–1257
Hervé of Donzy 1218–1222 (married to Mahault)
Agnes II of Donzy (daughter) 1218–1225 (deceased before her mother)
Guy II of Châtillon, count of Saint Pol 1223–1225 (married to Agnes II)
Gaucher of Châtillon (son)  ?  (deceased)
Yolande of Châtillon (daughter) ?–1254
Archambaud of Dampierre ?–1249  (Archambaud IX Lord of Bourbon) (married to Yolande)
Mahaut of Dampierre (daughter) 1257–1262
Odo of Burgundy 1257–1262 (married to Mahaut)
Alix of Burgundy (daughter) 1251–1290
John I 1273–1290 (married to Alix, joint rulers)
William VI the Great (son) 1290–1304
John II (son) 1304–1361
John III (son) 1361–1370
John IV (son) 1370
Sold to France 1370

References

 
History of Burgundy
 
Yonne
Former counties of France